The House on Trubnaya is a 1928 comedy film directed by Boris Barnet and starring Vera Maretskaya.

Plot
The film is set in Moscow at the height of the NEP. The petty-bourgeois public carries out their philistine life full of bustle and gossip in the house on the Trubnaya Street. One of the tenants, Mr. Golikov (Vladimir Fogel), owner of a hairdressing salon, is looking for a housekeeper who is modest, hard-working and non-union. A suitable candidate for use seems to him a country girl nicknamed Paranya, full name Praskovya Pitunova (Vera Maretskaya). Soon the house on Trubnaya receives shocking news that Praskovya Pitunova is elected deputy of the Mossovet by the maids' Trade Union.

Cast
 Vera Maretskaya as Parasha Pitunova - housemaid
 Vladimir Fogel as Mr. Golikov - hairdresser
 Yelena Tyapkina as Mrs. Golikova
 Sergei Komarov as Lyadov
 Anel Sudakevich as Marisha-maid
 Ada Vojtsik as Fenya
 Vladimir Batalov as Semyon Byvalov - chauffeur
 Aleksandr Gromov as Uncle Fedya
 Vladimir Uralsky (as V. Uralsky)

Production
The script "Parasha" written by Bella Zorich was at the Mezhrabpom-Rus studio for a long time without getting made into a film. The screenplay was written for Sergei Komarov, but after discussion it was decided that Boris Barnet will adapt the film. Zorich said that the story of the new Cinderella – Paranya Pitunova, was supposed to show how the Leninist slogan "Every cook must learn to govern the state" is interpreted in a distorted way by the philistine laymen. However Boris Barnet, when starting work on the film immediately commenced with modifying the script; the screenplay faced numerous rewrites by a multitude of authors including Viktor Shklovsky, Nikolai Erdman, Anatoli Marienhof, Vadim Shershenevich. The finished picture lost much of its satiric tone.

Reception
Russian Guild of Film Critics placed "The House on Trubnaya" in their list "100 best films of national cinema".

References

External links

1928 films
1928 comedy films
1920s Russian-language films
Soviet silent feature films
Soviet comedy films
Russian comedy films
Soviet black-and-white films
Films directed by Boris Barnet
Gorky Film Studio films
Russian black-and-white films
Russian silent feature films
Silent comedy films